Laurence Vichnievsky (born 5 February 1955 in Boulogne-Billancourt, Hauts-de-Seine) is a French magistrate and politician who has been serving as a member of the French National Assembly since the 2017 elections. She is a member of the Democratic Movement (MoDem), after having previously been a member of Europe Écologie–The Greens.

Early career
Vichnievsky became judge in Colombes in 1979 before becoming judge in Paris, notably being in charge of the Robert Boulin murder case. Along with Eva Joly, she became the lead magistrate in the Elf affair, the Dumas affair and the Taiwan frigates affairs.

Political career
Along with Joly, Vichnievsky joined the Europe Écologie movement. She was selected to be Europe Écologie–The Greens' candidate in the Provence-Alpes-Côte d'Azur for the 2010 regional elections. As a consequence, she had to relinquish her position as advocate general in the Erika maritime pollution appeal case and no longer handled major criminal cases.

During a 2011 party congress, Vichnievsky was appointed spokesperson of the Europe Écologie–The Greens national executive board but resigned soon after amid disagreements over pension policy with Joly and Cécile Duflot.

In the 2015 regional elections, Vichnievsky was reelected on the list of MoDem.

In the 2017 national elections, Vichnievsky became a member of the National Assembly. In parliament, she has since been serving on the Committee on Legal Affairs. In addition to her committee assignments, she is also one of six Assembly members who serve as judges of the Cour de Justice de la République.

As member of the Committee on Legal Affairs, Vichnievsky authored an amendment to a 2020 security law, in which she sought to limit public authorities' ability to subcontract security services.

References

1955 births
Living people
Europe Ecology – The Greens politicians
Women members of the National Assembly (France)
Deputies of the 15th National Assembly of the French Fifth Republic
21st-century French women politicians
Democratic Movement (France) politicians
Regional councillors of Auvergne-Rhône-Alpes
Deputies of the 16th National Assembly of the French Fifth Republic